Sparks may refer to:

Places
Sparks, Georgia
Sparks, Kansas
Sparks, Kentucky
Sparks, Maryland
Sparks, Nebraska
Sparks, Nevada
Sparks, Oklahoma
Sparks, Texas
Sparks, Bell County, Texas
Sparks, West Virginia

Books
Sparks (Raffi novel) (1884)
Sparks (Ally Kennen novel), 2010
Sparks!, a graphic novel by Ian Boothby and Nina Matsumoto

Film and TV
Sparks (film), a 2013 film
Sparks (TV series), a 1996-1998 American television series starring Terrence Howard and James Avery
Sparks (Matrix character), a character in Enter the Matrix and The Matrix Revolutions
Sparks (G.I. Joe), a fictional character in the G.I. Joe universe
 Sparks, a fictional football team in Footballers' Wives
 Sparks, one of the four protagonists in SuperKitties

Music
Sparks (band), a rock band led by brothers Ron and Russell Mael
Halfnelson (album) or Sparks, their debut album
Sparks (Imogen Heap album) (2014)
Sparks (Fiction Plane album) (2010)
Sparks (Sahara Hotnights album) (2009)
Sparks (Roberto Paci Dalò album) (2007)
Sparks!, a 1970 album by Melvin Sparks

Songs
 "Sparks" (Stevie Appleton song)
 "Sparks" (Cover Drive song)
 "Sparks" (Röyksopp song)
 "Sparks" (Hilary Duff song)
 "Sparks", a song by Coldplay from Parachutes
 "Sparks", a song by Kylie Minogue from Kiss Me Once
 "Sparks", a song by Neon Hitch from Eleutheromaniac
 "Sparks", a song by Parkway Drive from Atlas
 "Sparks", a song by t.A.T.u. from Waste Management
 "Sparks", a song by The Who from Tommy

Organizations
Central Sparks, an English women's cricket team
Los Angeles Sparks, a Women's National Basketball Association team
Sparks, the youngest age bracket of the Girl Guides of Canada

Brands
Sparks (drink), a canned alcoholic beverage sold in the United States
Sparks Steak House, a restaurant in New York City

Other uses
Sparks (name), a family name (including a list of people and fictional characters)
Sinthusa or sparks, a genus of butterflies of the Indomalayan realm

See also
Spark (disambiguation)
Sparks Street, Ottawa, Canada
Sparx (disambiguation)